was a castle built in Mino Province in Japan in 1597. Though the castle spanned the Sengoku and Edo periods, it barely did so as the castle was demolished in 1610. The castle supported the Saitō, Oda and Toyotomi clans.

History
The castle was built by Katō Sadayasu in 1597. Though Sadayasu supported the Toki clan, Katō Mitsuyasu, his father, supported the Saitō clan and Toyotomi Hideyoshi, who provided many of the stones for the construction of the castle. Mitsuyasu join in the invasions of Korea, but died of illness during his trip home in 1593, putting Sadayasu in charge of construction.

Present
At present, there is a marker designating the former location of the castle. The surrounding area has been developed into a park. Though the donjon no longer exists, the moat, earthen walls and foundation stones still remain.

References

Buildings and structures in Gifu
Castles in Gifu Prefecture
Houses completed in 1597
Historic Sites of Japan
Former castles in Japan
Ruined castles in Japan